Tibor Cselkó (born 8 May 1931) is a Hungarian former basketball player who competed in the 1952 Summer Olympics. He was born in Budapest. He was part of the Hungarian basketball team, which was eliminated after the group stage of the 1952 tournament. He played all six matches.

References

Hungarian men's basketball players
Olympic basketball players of Hungary
Basketball players at the 1952 Summer Olympics
FIBA EuroBasket-winning players
Basketball players from Budapest
1931 births
Living people